Lee Richardson is the name of:

Lee Richardson (actor) (1926–1999), American character actor
Lee Richardson (politician) (born 1947), Canadian politician
Lee Richardson (speedway rider) (1979–2012), British motorcycle speedway rider
Lee Richardson (footballer) (born 1969), British football manager

See also
Leigh Richardson (1924–2008), Belizean politician
Richardson (surname)